, provisional designation , is a stony asteroid, classified as near-Earth object of the Apollo group and potentially hazardous asteroid, approximately 1 kilometer in diameter. It was discovered on 24 June 1998, by the LINEAR survey at the Lincoln Laboratory's Experimental Test Site in Socorro, New Mexico.

Description 

 orbits the Sun at a distance of 0.9–3.9 AU once every 3 years and 9 months (1,366 days). Its orbit has an eccentricity of 0.62 and an inclination of 2° with respect to the ecliptic. It is also a Mars-crossing asteroid.

Shortly after its discovery,  was imaged by radar at Goldstone and Arecibo.

The study showed that the asteroid has a rotation period of 15 hours, and a shape that is roughly spherical, with some steep protrusions and large craters.

On 24 August 2013 it passed at a distance of 21.9 Lunar distances. It was hoped to be observed by Goldstone radar.

Numbering and naming 

This minor planet was numbered by the Minor Planet Center on 16 February 2003. As of 2018, it has not been named.

References

External links 
 Asteroid Lightcurve Database (LCDB), query form (info )
 Dictionary of Minor Planet Names, Google books
 Asteroids and comets rotation curves, CdR – Observatoire de Genève, Raoul Behrend
 
 
 

052760
052760
052760
052760
20130824
19980624